Historical cities and settlements of Russia are settlements of historical and archaeological importance in Russia, as defined by Russian governments from a 1970 decree through a 2002 federal law.

History of official designations 
The official definition of this status was first decreed in the Soviet Union in May 1970, when the first official list of 115 historical settlements was declared. It was confirmed in the Russian SFSR in February 1990, with a significantly expanded list of 426 cities/towns, 54 urban-type settlements, and 56 villages. On June 25, 2002 the federal law of Russia, #73-FZ, On the Objects of Cultural Heritage (Cultural and Historical Monuments) of the Peoples of Russian Federation confirmed this status for 478 settlements. In 2010, the list was revised and only 41 cities remained in it. In 2016, Sevastopol was added to the list. 

Historical cities in Russia are separated into four categories based on the value of their historical legacy:

Category I : historical cities of worldwide importance, the uniquene legacy of which is recognised by the world community and requires exceptional efforts to conserve.
Category II :  historical cities of local importance, the legacy of which requires development of special reconstruction projects and multifactor conservation programmes.
Category III : historical cities of local importance, the legacy of which makes them stand out of the rest of the list.
Category IV : other historical cities.

The current list 
 Azov
 Arzamas
 Astrakhan
 Belozersk
 Veliky Ustyug
 Verkhoturye
 Vladimir
 Volsk
 Vyborg
 Galich
 Gorokhovets
 Derbent
 Yelabuga
 Yelets
 Yeniseysk
 Zaraysk
 Irkutsk
 Kasimov
 Kargopol
 Kineshma
 Kolomna
 Kostroma
 Krapivna, Tula Oblast
 Kyakhta
 Ostashkov
 Plyos
 Rostov
 Saint Petersburg
 Sevastopol
 Smolensk
 Solvychegodsk
 Starocherkasskaya
 Suzdal
 Taganrog
 Tomsk
 Torzhok
 Toropets
 Totma
 Tutayev
 Chistopol
 Shuya
 Yaroslavl

References
List of historical cities

External links 
List of Old-Russian Towns (last quarter of the 14th - early 15th century) - Interactive scholarly edition, with critical English translation and multimodal resources mashup (publications, images, videos).

See also 
 Golden Ring of cities northeast of Moscow, Russia
 Russian history

Cities and towns in Russia
Histories of cities in Russia
Heritage registers in Russia
Community awards